Elvis Belt is an album of selected early singles, EPs and Peel Sessions released by the Leeds-based indie rock band Cud in 1990 through Imaginary Records. LP catalogue number ILLCD 013

The cover image features original Cud guitarist Dave Read sporting the Elvis Belt that gave him his nickname.

Vinyl copies of the LP included a cartoon strip drawn by Cud bassist William Potter.

An expanded double-CD version was released through Cherry Red Records in March 2008 and entitled Elvis Handbag.

Track listing
Elvis Belt
"Slack Time" - 2.55
"Make No Bones" - 2.23
"Treat Me Bad" - 4.44
"Punishment-Reward Relationship" - 2.35
"Under My Hat" - 2.45
"Lola" - 3.37
"Urban Spaceman" - 1.07
"Art!" - 1.54
"You're The Boss" - 3.05
"Only (A Prawn in Whitby)" - 3.08
"Hey!Wire (The Stratospheric Mix) [remixed by Earl Ether]" - 2.57
"I've Had It With Blondes" - 3.31

Elvis Handbag Expanded version CD2

"Mind the Gap" (Peel Session) - 2.11
"Everybody Works So Hard" (Peel Session) - 2.43
"BB Cudn't C" (Peel Session) - 2.49
"Bohemian Rhapsody" - 2.53
"Manchester" - 3.01
"Purple Love Balloon" (Original Version) - 4.57
"Possession" (Original Version) - 3.53
"Remember What It Is That You Love" - 4.31
"Marjorie" - 2.03
"Down Down" - 3.21
"Magic" (1994 Version) - 4.01
"Living Changing" (Previously Unreleased) - 5.03
"Before Tomorrow" - 3.09
"Judas Kiss" - 3.15
"Back Door Santa" (hidden track) - 4.11
"Weirdy Beardy" (hidden track) - 5.56

Personnel
Carl Puttnam – vocals
Mike Dunphy – guitars
William Potter – bass guitar
Steve Goodwin – drums

References

External links

Cud (band) compilation albums
1990 compilation albums
Imaginary Records compilation albums